"Long Day's Journey Into Night" is a 1973 videotaped television adaptation of Eugene O'Neill's 1956 play of the same name. It was written by Michael Blakemore and  directed Peter Wood with Cecil Clarke as executive producer. The recording is a version of Royal National Theatre's 1971 staging of the play, and features Laurence Olivier (Tyrone), Constance Cummings (Mary), Denis Quilley (Jamie), Ronald Pickup (Edmund), and Maureen Lipman (Cathleen).

Plot
The play follows one day in the lives of the Tyrone family, each member is troubled and has been damaged by alcohol or other drugs. They have issues with each other that lead to fights and an inability to reconcile with one another.

Cast and characters
 Laurence Olivier - James Tyrone, Sr.
 Constance Cummings  - Mary Tyrone
 Denis Quilley  - James Tyrone, Jr. ("Jamie")
 Ronald Pickup   - Edmund Tyrone
 Maureen Lipman  - Cathleen

Productions
Olivier had often been asked to take on the role of Tyrone, but was relctuant to take the part of the ageing actor as he felt there were too many traps that would lead to the role being a stereotype of himself as an actor. His concerns proved unfounded and the play was a critical and commercial hit that revived the fortunes of The National Theatre.

Award and nominations
 Olivier won the Emmy Award for Outstanding Single Performance by an Actor in a Leading Role (1973)
 The production received an Emmy nomination for Outstanding Single Program - Drama or Comedy (1973)
 Olivier was nominated for Best Actor in the British Academy Television Awards (1974)

References

External links
 

1973 British television episodes
1973 television plays
British television plays
ITV Sunday Night Theatre
Works about alcoholism
Works about dysfunctional families
Television shows shot at ATV Elstree Studios
Television shows produced by Associated Television (ATV)